Trachypepla protochlora is a moth of the family Oecophoridae first described by Edward Meyrick in 1883. It is endemic to New Zealand and is found in both the North and South Islands. The preferred habitat of this species is native forest and adults are on the wing from October until February. Adults can be variable in their green shaded colour as well as in the intensity of markings on their forewings. The greenish ground colouration of this moth ensures they are well camouflaged when at rest on green mosses and lichens.

Taxonomy 
This species was first described by Edward Meyrick in 1883 using specimens collected at Palmerston and at the foot of Ōtira Gorge in January and February. A fuller description of this species was given by Meyrick in 1884. The male genitalia of this species was studied and illustrated by Alfred Philpott in 1927. George Hudson discussed and illustrated this species in his 1928 book The butterflies and moths of New Zealand. The male lectotype, collected at Ōtira Gorge, is held at the Natural History Museum, London.

Description

Meyrick described this species as follows:

The green shaded colouring and the intensity of markings on the forewings of this moth are variable. The greenish ground colour of this moth ensures it is well camouflaged when at rest on mosses and green lichens.

Distribution

T. protochlora is endemic to New Zealand. This species has been recorded in both the North and South Islands including in Auckland, at National Park, Mount Taranaki, Palmerston North, Wellington, Ōtira Gorge and Invercargill. Hudson believed it to be a rare species in the North Island but relatively common in the southern parts of the South Island.

Habitat 
The preferred habitat of T. protochlora is native forest.

Behaviour 
The adults of this species have been observed being on the wing from October until February. This species has been collected by beating foliage.

References 

Moths described in 1883
Oecophoridae
Taxa named by Edward Meyrick
Moths of New Zealand
Endemic fauna of New Zealand
Endemic moths of New Zealand